Kopperl Independent School District is a public school district based in the community of Kopperl, Texas (USA). The district operates one school that serves students in grades pre-kindergarten through twelve.

Academic achievement
In 2015, the school was rated "Met Standard" by the Texas Education Agency.

Special programs

Athletics
Kopperl High School plays six-man football.

See also

List of school districts in Texas

References

External links
Kopperl ISD

School districts in Bosque County, Texas